North Marion High School may refer to:

North Marion High School (Florida) — Citra, Florida
North Marion High School (Oregon) — Aurora, Oregon
North Marion High School (West Virginia) — Rachel, West Virginia (postal address in Farmington)